New York's 17th State Senate district is one of 63 districts in the New York State Senate. It has  been represented by Democrat Simcha Felder since 2013, following his defeat of incumbent Republican David Storobin in 2012. Since his first election, Felder has run on both the Democratic and Republican party lines and has alternately caucused with both parties; since July 2019, he has been a member of the Democratic caucus.

Geography
District 17 is located in Southern and Southwestern Brooklyn, including some or all of the neighborhoods of Borough Park, Midwood, Sunset Park, Kensington, Bensonhurst, and Gravesend.

The district overlaps with New York's 7th, 9th, 10th, and 11th congressional districts, and with the 41st, 42nd, 44th, 45th, 47th, 48th, 49th, and 51st districts of the New York State Assembly.

Recent election results

2020

As he had done in the past, Felder ran in 2020 on both the Democratic and Republican party lines.

2018

Jumaane Williams, then a  New York City Councilmember, did not actively campaign, and was listed on the ballot to allow the Working Families Party to remove him from consideration for the 2018 lieutenant gubernatorial election, in accordance with complex New York election laws.

2016

In 2016, Felder ran on both the Democratic and Republican party lines.

2014

2012

Federal results in District 17

References

17